The Kraemer-Harman House is a historic house at 513 2nd Street in Hot Springs, Arkansas.  It is a -story wood-frame structure, originally built in 1884 with vernacular styling, and embellished in the 20th century with Craftsman and Classical Revival elements. It has a hip-roof porch extending across its front, supported by square columns mounted on short brick piers.  The interior features particularly elaborate Craftsman style, with carved plaster ceilings, and a buffet with ornate woodwork and leaded glass doors.

The house was listed on the National Register of Historic Places in 1999.

See also
National Register of Historic Places listings in Garland County, Arkansas

References

Houses on the National Register of Historic Places in Arkansas
Houses completed in 1884
Houses in Hot Springs, Arkansas
National Register of Historic Places in Hot Springs, Arkansas